Jabberwocky is a 1977 British fantasy comedy film co-written and directed by Terry Gilliam. Jabberwocky stars Michael Palin as Dennis, a cooper's apprentice, who is forced through clumsy, often slapstick misfortunes to hunt a terrible dragon after the death of his father. The film's title is taken from the nonsense poem "Jabberwocky" from Lewis Carroll's Through the Looking-Glass (1871).

The film is Gilliam's solo directorial debut, after he co-directed Monty Python and the Holy Grail with Terry Jones in 1975. The film received a mixed response from critics and audiences.

Plot
In the depths of the Dark Ages, a carnivorous monster ravages the domains of King Bruno the Questionable. Life carries on as normal in isolated villages; in one of which, innocent young Dennis Cooper pursues a career as a cooper in his ailing father's workshop. Mr. Cooper, senior, despises his son for valuing profit over craftsmanship, and when his illness becomes terminal he publicly disinherits Dennis in an abuse-ridden deathbed speech. Dennis decides to travel to the kingdom's capital city, establish a new career, and then return to marry his love, a local woman named Griselda Fishfinger who doesn't reciprocate his affection. While trying to say goodbye to an inattentive Griselda, she throws away a rotten potato which Dennis catches and keeps as a cherished memento.

King Bruno's city is full of terrified refugees from villages destroyed by the monster. The only people pleased with the situation are a cabal of rich merchants selling overpriced goods to the refugees.  None of the overburdened local craftsmen will listen to Dennis' suggestions for "improving efficiency", and he struggles to find work or food. Meanwhile, the king has decided to send a knight against the monster, and organizes a jousting tournament to find the best warrior for the job. If successful, the knight will be promoted to prince and married to the Princess, who lives in a tower, wishing a true prince will arrive and marry her.

A man named Ethel, squire to the Knight of the Red Herring, befriends Dennis and gives him a meal. Misunderstandings ensue and Dennis finds himself fleeing from a tavern keeper whose wife Ethel seduced. He seeks refuge in the tower, where the Princess, in a great feat of wishful thinking, takes him for an adventuring prince disguised as a peasant. Dennis is too bewildered to explain the truth, but he does convey that he already has a lover and the Princess sorrowfully lets him go. She lends him a nun's habit to use as a disguise, which leads to a run-in with a group of religious fanatics who believe he is Satan in the guise of a nun (or possibly a nun in the guise of Satan).

The joust grows increasingly bloody, and Passelewe, King Bruno's chamberlain, worries that all the knights will end up killed or incapacitated. He convinces the king to call off the fighting and instead pick a champion based on the outcome of a game of hide and seek. Red Herring emerges victorious. Ethel wants to stay in the city and pursue his affair with the tavern keeper's wife, so he bullies Dennis into taking his place as squire. The huge and dimwitted knight appears never to notice.

In order to continue profiting from the crisis the city merchants hire another warrior, the Black Knight, who rides to the monster's lair and assassinates Red Herring. He is about to kill Dennis as well, but the monster appears—a horrific, dragon-like biped—and the Black Knight is compelled to fight for his own life. After a titanic struggle, he appears to slay the monster, but it revives and knocks him off a cliff.  Dennis accidentally slays it when it impales itself on a sword he was holding while cowering, and then cuts off the monster's head, brings it to the king, and takes credit for the exploit. Griselda is more interested in Dennis now that he is a hero, but he never gets the chance to marry her. King Bruno the Questionable keeps his word, and Dennis is given half the kingdom, married to the Princess, and swept off to his honeymoon and an uncertain fate.

Cast

 Michael Palin as Dennis Cooper
 Harry H. Corbett as The Squire (Ethel)
 John Le Mesurier as Passelewe
 Warren Mitchell as Mr. Fishfinger
 Annette Badland as Griselda Fishfinger
 Max Wall as King Bruno the Questionable / Voice of Red Herring
 Deborah Fallender as The Princess
 Jerold Wells as Wat Dabney
 Bernard Bresslaw as The Landlord
 Rodney Bewes as The Other Squire
 John Bird as 1st Herald
 Neil Innes as 2nd Herald
 Peter Cellier as 1st Merchant
 Frank Williams as 2nd Merchant
 Terry Jones as Poacher
 Brian Glover as Armourer
 Graham Crowden as Fanatics' Leader
 Bryan Pringle as Guard at the Gate
 Harold Goodwin as 1st Peasant
 Kenneth Colley as 1st Fanatic
 Gorden Kaye as Sister Jessica
 Derrick O'Connor as Flying Hogfish Peasant
 Terry Gilliam as Man with Rock
 David Prowse as Red Herring and Black Knights

Production
The film is close in setting and comic style to Monty Python and the Holy Grail, on which Gilliam had co-directed. In addition to Palin, Python Terry Jones and Python contributor Neil Innes appeared in Jabberwocky, giving it a Python-esque feel, with many scenes (such as the "hide and seek" jousting tournament) reminiscent of Holy Grail. For its American premiere the film was advertised as Monty Python's Jabberwocky despite protests from Gilliam.

Filming locations
The film was shot on location in Wales. There are two castles in the film: Pembroke Castle and Chepstow Castle. The Jabberwocky battle scenes were filmed in an old Pembroke stone quarry.

Monster

The Jabberwock is a man in costume similar to the classic Japanese Godzilla film effects. To recreate the illustrated monster of the 19th century storybook, the costume is designed to be worn by a man walking backwards. Hip and knee joints are reversed giving it a bird-like gait. The actor's head is hidden within the monster's torso – the large marionette head on a serpentine neck is controlled by an offscreen pole and lines, which are visible on the print. Long bird-like claws extend out of his shoe heels and his arms become the Jabberwock's wings. Film speed is altered in some scenes to slow the monster's movements and camera angles manipulate perspective in scenes with live actors to depict the monster's immense size. Director Terry Gilliam, during the DVD commentary, stated that the Jabberwock's 'Death Fall' came about accidentally when the actor tripped during filming but because the fall was so natural it was used in the final print.

Themes

Commerce
One of the most noticeable themes in the film is that of commerce. Dennis Cooper is unable to continue his work as a cooper after being gleefully disowned by his dying father. Despite Cooper having good ideas about raising productivity, the merchants and businessmen he meets are unwilling to listen to him. He moves from his village to the enclosed town in search of business opportunity. Dennis discovers that the guilds and merchants control business and that outsiders are struggling to survive. While in the city he discovers Wat Dabney, a legendary cooper and inventor of the "inverted firkin". Despite his skill, Wat is excluded by the guilds and has cut his foot off in an attempt to become a beggar – an act so successful that he ends up cutting off his other foot by the film's end.

The top merchants in the town profit handsomely from fear of the Jabberwock and are reluctant to help the King end the crisis. The Bishop is happy that fear has led to increased donations to the church and increased attendances at mass and confession ("piety ain't never been higher!"). The Bishop is so unimpressed by the King's choice of a champion to slay the monster that he blesses the champion by simply flicking holy water at him with his index finger. The merchants conspire to send the "black knight" (portrayed by David Prowse in his last pre-Darth Vader role) to kill the king's champion (also played by David Prowse) and are aghast when Dennis comes back with the monster's head.

"Creaking bureaucracy"
King Bruno the Questionable and his aide, Passelewe are aged rulers in a castle that is falling apart. Darkness, dust, cobwebs and fallen plaster lie everywhere. It is so dark and decrepit that the town outside is refreshing in comparison. So entrenched are these two in their misrule that the only way the King can find an answer to the Jabberwock is to emulate the deeds of his great-great-great-great-great-grandfather (Max the Vainglorious) and hold a tournament to select a champion; a decision which works because Dennis manages to accompany the champion (Dennis chances to slay the Jabberwock after the champion is killed by the Black Knight).

The "creaking bureaucracy" also includes the inept behaviour of his herald, who is far more concerned with heralding than in the message he is communicating, a process which eventually prevents the King from speaking and ends with the herald losing his head.

Accidental and unconventional happiness
An important theme that Gilliam cited on the film's audio commentary is happiness. By the end of the film Dennis gets everything a fairy tale hero would want (recognition for killing the beast, the princess' hand in marriage and half of the kingdom) by accident. All Dennis wanted was to live a humdrum life, with an overweight peasant girl who didn't even like him.

Reception

Critical response
Jabberwocky received a mixed response from critics. On Rotten Tomatoes, it holds a rating of 48%, based on 21 reviews, with an average rating of 5.9/10.

Vincent Canby of The New York Times wrote the film a positive review, describing it as "the most marvelously demented British comedy to come along since Monty Python and The Holy Grail, to which Jabberwocky is a sort of stepson." Variety gave the film a mixed review, praising the monster as "inspired dark imagination," but ultimately describing the film as "long on jabber but short on yocks." Gene Siskel of the Chicago Tribune gave the film a one-star negative review, calling it "a film suitable for those who like unfunny comedies" and added that "to link it to Lewis Carroll or to his poem is to insult both." He further commented:

References

External links
 
 
 
 
 
 Jabberwocky: Through the Looking Glass and What Terry Found There an essay by Scott Tobias at the Criterion Collection

1977 films
1977 directorial debut films
1970s fantasy comedy films
1970s adventure comedy films
British adventure comedy films
British fantasy comedy films
British independent films
British satirical films
Films based on poems
Films directed by Terry Gilliam
Films set in castles
Films with screenplays by Terry Gilliam
Films produced by Sanford Lieberson
Films based on works by Lewis Carroll
1977 independent films
1970s satirical films
1977 comedy films
Jabberwocky
1970s English-language films
1970s British films